The 154th Infantry Brigade (part of the 51st (Highland) Infantry Division) was an infantry brigade of the British Army division that fought during both the First and Second world wars. The brigade was raised in 1908, upon the creation of the Territorial Force, as the Argyll and Sutherland Brigade and was later redesignated as the 154th (3rd Highland) Brigade. The division was referred to as the "Highway Decorators" by other divisions who became used to discovering the 'HD' insignia painted wherever the Highlanders had passed through.

154th Brigade was luckier than its sister brigades of the 51st Division (152nd and 153rd). It was detached in June 1940 to form the mobile battlegroup "Arkforce" and was able to escape from Northern France while the rest of the division was forced to surrender at St Valery-en-Caux. However, the brigade was severely understrength by the time it returned to Britain, and in August 1940 it was reorganised and merged with the 28th Infantry Brigade of 9th (Highland) Infantry Division to form part of the new 51st Division. In this capacity it went on to serve in North Africa, Sicily and North-West Europe.

Campaign Honours
 Battle of France - 1939-1940 (destroyed)
 Battle of El Alamein - 1942
 Operation Supercharge - 1942
 Operation Pugilist - 1943
 Operation Husky - 1943
 Operation Overlord - 1944
 Operation Astonia - 1944
 Battle of the Scheldt - 1944
 Battle of the Bulge - 1944-45
 Operation Plunder - 1945

Order of battle

First World War
 1/6th Battalion, Argyll and Sutherland Highlanders
 1/7th Battalion, Argyll and Sutherland Highlanders
 1/8th Battalion, Argyll and Sutherland Highlanders
 1/9th Battalion, Argyll and Sutherland Highlanders
 1/4th Battalion, Seaforth Highlanders
 1/4th Battalion, Gordon Highlanders
 1/9th Battalion, Royal Scots

1939-1940
 6th Battalion, Black Watch (Royal Highland Regiment)
 7th Battalion, Argyll and Sutherland Highlanders
 8th Battalion, Argyll and Sutherland Highlanders

1940-1945
 1st Battalion, Black Watch (Royal Highland Regiment)
 7th Battalion, Black Watch (Royal Highland Regiment)
 7th Battalion, Argyll and Sutherland Highlanders

References

Further reading

External links

Infantry brigades of the British Army
Infantry brigades of the British Army in World War I
Infantry brigades of the British Army in World War II
Military units and formations of Scotland
Military units and formations established in 1908
Military units and formations disestablished in 1919
Military units and formations established in 1928
Military units and formations disestablished in 1946